Italo Rota (Milan, 2 October 1953) is an Italian architect.

Biography
Born in Milan in 1953, he obtained a degree in Architecture at Milan Polytechnic University in 1982. Before that, he had started off in the architecture firms of Franco Albini and Vittorio Gregotti. During his four-year apprenticeship with Gregotti, he worked on his project for the Calabria University (1972–1973). He took part in the publishing of the magazine Lotus International in collaboration with architect Pierluigi Nicolin. Following this experience, the press and books became particularly important in Rota’s life, leading him to the development of a personal collection. At the beginning of the 1980s, he moved to Paris, where his two children were born, to work with Gae Aulenti on the project of the Musée d’Orsay, putting the museum at the centre of a wider concept. This experience continued in 1985, when Rota won the competition for the new rooms of the French School of the Cour Carré at the Louvre, inaugurated in 1992, and more recently, of the Museo del Novecento in Milan (2002–2010). During the twenty years he spent in France, he dealt with various aspects of design, from urban projects to layout plans for exhibitions, events and cultural institutions. Still in France, he worked in the theatre when new Italian scenographers. In those years, Rota worked above all with director Bernard Sobel. In 1988 he designed the scenography for Hécube and, using mirrors and back lighting, recreated in a surreal manner the seats of a Greek theatre. He officially came back in Italy in 1996, moving his base from Paris to Milan, where he also served as City Councillor for urban quality (1995–1996). Rota’s studio in Milan is an integral part of his work, there he gathered objets trouvés, books and pieces taken from various collections, from Yuri Gagarin’s helmet to masks from Central Africa, mixed up with material samples, drawings and maquettes. Throughout his career, he has been entrusted with many projects within and without the national boundaries. Between the end of the 1990s and 2005, Italo Rota designed the multimedia libraries in Anzola and San Sito. For Roberto Cavalli, he worked on boutiques and clubs all over the world, as well as on a villa on the hills near Florence. His works include land architecture projects, such as the requalification of the town centre of Nantes (1992–1995) and the Foro Italico promenade in Palermo (2005), and projects for buildings, such as the Boscolo Exedra Hotel in Milan, the Hindu temple of Lord Hanuman, the Ciudades de Agua pavilion for the Expo 2008 in Zaragoza, the Triennale Design Museum in 2007, as well as the above-mentioned Museo del Novecento, inaugurated in December 2010.

Teaching activity
Italo Rota was Professor of Design at the Ecole d’Architecture UP8 Paris-Belleville (1987–1990), the Faculty of Architecture of Ferrara (1998–2000) and the IED of Milan (1996–1998). He gave seminars in various faculties and schools of architecture, such as the Columbia University, Politecnico di Milano, Lausanne Faculty of Architecture and Geneva Faculty of Architecture. Currently, he is Director of the Design Department at the Nuova Accademia di Belle Arti in Milan and gives a workshop at IUAV on a project entitled Memory Garden. An exotic clubhouse.

Awards
 In 1994, Grand Prix de l’Urbanisme, Paris
 In 1996, Landmark Conservancy Prize, New York
 In 2002, Premio Città di Gubbio, Gubbio
 In 2003, Medaglia d’Oro all’Architettura Italiana
 In 2006, Medaglia d’Oro all’Architettura Italiana
 In 2009, Premio di Architettura ANCE Catania
 In 2010, Primo Premio del Marble Architectural Awards 2010 nella categoria “Interni”
 In 2011, Premio Internazionale Ischia di Architettura (PIDA)

References

External links

 
 Profile at Meritalia.it
 Profile at Quodlibet.it
 Profile at Skira.net
 Profile at Driade.com
 Profile at NABA.it

1953 births
Living people
Architects from Milan
Polytechnic University of Milan alumni
Academic staff of the Polytechnic University of Milan
20th-century Italian architects
People associated with the Louvre